Back to Stay is a 2011 Argentine-Swiss comedy-drama film, written and directed by Milagros Mumenthaler and is her first full-length feature film. The film won the Golden Leopard at the 2011 Locarno International Film Festival and the Golden Astor at the Mar del Plata International Film Festival.

Cast
 María Canale
 Martina Juncadella
 Ailín Salas
 Julián Tello

Awards

References

External links
 

2011 films
2011 directorial debut films
2011 comedy-drama films
2010s Spanish-language films
Argentine comedy-drama films
Swiss comedy-drama films
Golden Leopard winners
Films set in Buenos Aires
Films shot in Buenos Aires
2010s Argentine films